Chang Yoon-hee (born ) is a retired South Korean female volleyball player. She was part of the South Korea women's national volleyball team. On the club level she played with Honam Oil, which later became LG Oil and then GS Caltex.

Chang made a strong start to her career by winning the Most Valuable Player of the Year award in 1989. 
She was named "best server" at the 1989 FIVB Volleyball Women's World Cup, and "best defender" at the 1991 FIVB Volleyball Women's World Cup.
In 1996, she stated that she had no intention of getting married or retiring in the near future. After the 1996 Summer Olympics, she stepped down from the national team, but continued to play at the club level. She married national cycling team member Lee Kyung-hwan in April 1997. Though initially concerned about her ability to balance married life and the demands of volleyball, she returned to the national team again in 1998. She retired in 2002, and later became a coach for GS Caltex.

Clubs
 Honam Oil (1994)

Awards
 1989 World Cup "Best Server"
 1991 World Cup "Best Defender"

References

External links

1970 births
Living people
South Korean women's volleyball players
Volleyball players at the 1996 Summer Olympics
Olympic volleyball players of South Korea
People from Jeonju
Volleyball players at the 1990 Asian Games
Volleyball players at the 1994 Asian Games
Volleyball players at the 1998 Asian Games
Asian Games medalists in volleyball
Asian Games gold medalists for South Korea
Asian Games silver medalists for South Korea
Korea National Sport University alumni
Beach volleyball players at the 2002 Asian Games
Medalists at the 1990 Asian Games
Medalists at the 1994 Asian Games
Medalists at the 1998 Asian Games
Sportspeople from North Jeolla Province